John Cameron was a Scottish footballer, who played for Govan, Renfrew, Rangers and Scotland.

References

Sources

External links

London Hearts profile

Year of birth missing
Year of death missing
Scottish footballers
Scotland international footballers
Renfrew F.C. players
Rangers F.C. players
Association football forwards